Jack Taylor Green (26 August 1919 – 23 July 1981) was an Australian rules footballer who played with Collingwood in the Victorian Football League (VFL).

Green, a follower and defender, was Collingwood's 19th man in the 1939 VFL Grand Final, which they lost to Melbourne. He was the son of Jack W. Green, who was a Collingwood premiership player in 1917. His own son, also named Jack, played in the VFL as well, for Collingwood in the 1960s. After leaving Collingwood he joined the Warragul Football Club, as playing coach.

References

1919 births
Australian rules footballers from Victoria (Australia)
Collingwood Football Club players
Warragul Football Club players
1981 deaths